Dianna Graves is an American politician and accountant who served as a member of the West Virginia House of Delegates from the 38th district from 2017 to 2022. She was appointed to the House on September 19, 2017.

Early life and education 
Graves was born in Euless, Texas. She earned a Bachelor of Arts degree in political science from Stanford University.

Career 
Graves was a member of the Kanawha County Republican Executive Committee. She has worked as an accountant at Suttle & Stalnaker CPAs and Arnett Carbis Toothman. She was appointed to the West Virginia House of Delegates and assumed office on September 19, 2017, succeeding Nancy Reagan Foster. During the 2019–2020 legislative session, Graves served as vice chair of the House Pensions and Retirement Committee.

References 

Living people
People from Euless, Texas
Stanford University alumni
Republican Party members of the West Virginia House of Delegates
American accountants
Year of birth missing (living people)
21st-century American politicians
21st-century American women politicians
Women state legislators in West Virginia